GA7 may refer to:
 Georgia's 7th congressional district, a congressional district in the U.S. state of Georgia
 Georgia State Route 7, a state highway in the eastern part of the state
 GA7, gibberellin A7, a form of the gibberellin plant hormone
 Gulfstream American GA-7 Cougar, an American light aircraft